USS Burnett County (LST-512) was an  built for the United States Navy during World War II. Named for Burnett County, Wisconsin, she was the only U.S. Naval vessel to bear the name.

Construction
LST-512 was laid down on 22 July 1943, at Seneca, Illinois by the Chicago Bridge & Iron Company; launched on 10 December 1943; and conducted her trial runs in the Ohio and Mississippi Rivers. Sponsored by Mrs. Gerry DeWane, she was sent to New Orleans, Louisiana, for her final fitting out and was commissioned on 8 January 1944.

Service history
LST-512 was assigned to the European Theater and participated in the Invasion of Normandy, in June, 1944.

 
In October 1944, a severe storm in the English channel broached the ship on the beach, "breaking her back." She was towed to England, for temporary repairs, made by welding railroad iron alongside the damaged keel, then returned to the United States, where she was repaired and outfitted to do a war bond tour in the Great Lakes, Mississippi and Ohio Rivers. Leaving Norfolk, Virginia, in April 1945, the ship sailed to Miami, Florida, where soil and palm trees were loaded aboard to create a Pacific Island Jungle on a portion of the tank deck. She then moved to New Orleans, and was in that city on VE Day, 8 May 1945. She then began the journey up the Mississippi River to the Illinois River, and was the first LST to make the trip up both those rivers, and was the first and only LST to return to the inland shipyard where she was built. She arrived in Chicago, Illinois, on 21 May 1945, for additional preparation for the tour.  The tour commenced in Detroit, Michigan, on 12 June. Displays on the tank deck included a Pacific Island jungle complete with enemy snipers concealed in trees, a map with miniature models of LSTs making amphibious landings in the Pacific, a captured Kamikaze "Baka" plane, and film footage of the war in the Pacific. Visitors could also look into the engine rooms, and tour crew quarters. On the main deck were displays of US armor, vehicles and artillery alongside captured Japanese artillery and vehicles. In addition to the static displays, the ship gave live demonstrations of amphibious landings, which included simulated bombardment and air strikes, followed by Marines landing in LCVPs and Amtracs. Once the landing zone was "secured", the ship would approach the beach and offload additional Amtracs, tanks and vehicles. Invasions were demonstrated in several cities, including Detroit, Rochester, Buffalo, Cleveland, Toledo, Duluth, Milwaukee, and Chicago. The ship was returning from Duluth, and was passing through the Soo Locks, at Sault Ste. Marie, Michigan, on V-J Day. The tour concluded on 13 January 1946, in New Orleans. During the tour, over two million visitors came aboard.

Decommission
On 28 March 1947, LST-512 was decommissioned and assigned to the Pacific Reserve Fleet. On 1 July 1955, the ship was redesignated Burnett County (LST-512), and was struck from the Naval Vessel Register on 18 February 1957. LST-512 received one battle star for World War II Service.

Peru service
On 11 October 1957, she was sold to Peru. Renamed BAP Paita (LT-35), and commissioned in the Peruvian Navy. Employed as a training ship for the Peruvian Naval Academy. Later renumbered DT-141. Deleted 1983.

References

Bibliography

External links

LST-491-class tank landing ships
World War II amphibious warfare vessels of the United States
Burnett County, Wisconsin
Ships built in Seneca, Illinois
1943 ships